Robert House Peters Jr. (12 January 1916 – 1 October 2008) was an American character actor most noted for his roles in 1950s B movies and westerns. He is perhaps best remembered as the face and body of Mr. Clean in the Procter and Gamble cleaning product commercials of the era.

Biography
Peters was born in New Rochelle, New York to actors House Peters, a major leading man in the silent era, and Mae King. He grew up in Beverley Hills, California and graduated from Beverly Hills High School.

In a career that spanned 1935–1967, he appeared in many films, primarily as the "heavy," or villain. He appeared in television series including Perry Mason, Bat Masterson, Gunsmoke, The Twilight Zone and Lassie.

From the late 1950s into the 1960s, Peters Jr. played Mr. Clean in television commercials for the product.

Peters served in the United States Army Air Forces' Air Sea Rescue section as a small-boat operator during World War II. He was married to Lucy Peters from 1946 until his death; they had three children. He died of pneumonia at the Motion Picture and Television Fund Hospital in Los Angeles, California.

Peters wrote a book, "Another Side of Hollywood" an autobiography by actor House Peters Jr. published by Empire Publishing of Madison, North Carolina in the year 2000. It is an entertaining, interesting look at the early days of Hollywood movie and television production with many black and white photos.

Filmography

References

External links

1916 births
2008 deaths
20th-century American male actors
American male film actors
American male television actors
Beverly Hills High School alumni
Deaths from pneumonia in California
Male actors from New Rochelle, New York
Male Western (genre) film actors
Military personnel from New York (state)
United States Army Air Forces soldiers
United States Army Air Forces personnel of World War II